The Non Resident Nepali Association (गैर-आवासीय नेपाली संघ) is an association of Non Resident Nepalis (NRN).

International Coordination Council
International Coordination Council (ICC) is the highest global representative executive body of the NRNA and provides overall guidance and directives to the executive committee. Each NCC nominates its members, in a number as prescribed by the NRNA Charter, to represent itself to the ICC. ICC also includes additional members co-opted by the ICC through its meetings. To seek advice on various issues of the NRNs, the ICC also nominates a number of recognized individuals as ICC Advisors.

Dr. Upendra Mahato was the first president of the ICC (2003–2009).

Mr. Dev Man Hirachan was the president of the ICC (2009–2011).

Mr. Jiba Lamichhane was the president of the ICC (2011–2013)

Mr. Shesh Ghale is a past president of the ICC (2013–2015 and 2015–2017).

Mr. Bhaban Bhatta is a past president of the ICC (2017–2019)

Mr. Kumar Panta is a past president of the ICC (2019-2021)

Mr. Kul Acharya, Mrs. Rabina Thapa & Dr. Badri K.C are current presidents of the ICC (2021-2023)

National Coordination Councils
The National Coordination Councils (NCC) serve as the NRNA organization's global network of its chapters, which are currently established in 60 countries around the world. NRNs residing in any country with the exception of SAARC countries can establish a NCC of the NRNA if there are more than 10 individual. Most of the NCCs are independently registered as the national organizations of Nepali Diaspora with the respective Governments in the countries of their residence.

Membership of the NRNA
The NRNA Charter has provision for the following types of membership:

1. General Member:
Any Nepali residing in any foreign country for more than 182 days in a year or the people of Nepali origin possessing any other citizenship can be a general member. The foreign country and other citizenship can't be of the SAARC countries.

2. Registered Member:
Any general member registered with a National Coordination Council (NCC) or registered with the International Coordination Council (ICC) is a registered member. In case of a country where there is no NCC, one needs to pay the pre-determined membership fee.

3. Associate Member;
Non-Nepali individuals or institutions interested in helping and promoting Nepal can be an associate member.

4. Honorary Member:
A person with recognized contributions to the NRN movement can be conferred as the honorary member by the ICC.

Functions
The NRNA carries out various activities to serve the interests of Nepali Diaspora. Some functions it carries out are:

1. Organizes global and regional conferences and interaction programs for itfos stakeholders.

2. Facilitates strong networking among the NRNs, resident Nepalis and Nepali organizations worldwide.

3. Liaise with the National Coordination Councils, Nepali associations abroad, government and international organizations.

4. Acts as a forum for the promotion and protection of the interests of the NRN community both in Nepal and abroad.

References

External links
 Non Resident Nepali Association official website
 Non Resident Nepali Act, 2007
 Official Website of Government of Nepal
 Nrna-canada.org
 Nrn.nepalko.info
 Nepal Library Foundation (NLF)

Diaspora organizations
Demographics of Nepal
Nepalese American
Organisations based in Nepal
2003 establishments in Nepal